The Huaca del Dragon, also called Huaca del Arco Iris is an archeological site located in the Peruvian city of Trujillo, near Chan Chan. It is a large religious monument, administrative and ceremonial center.  It is constructed of adobe, with murals decorated with friezes in relief showing human figures and representing a rainbow.

Description
Upon entering the Huaca a ramp leads to the first level. Figures carved on the walls take the form of a dragon (hence its name).  Another ramp, smaller than the first, leads to the second level. This level hosts pits, which were possibly used to store food.

See also
 Iperu, tourist information and assistance
 Tourism in Peru
 Huaca del Sol
 Chan Chan
 Huaca Esmeralda
 Chimu
 Chotuna-Chornancap

References

Further reading
 Kubler, George. (1962). The Art and Architecture of Ancient America, Ringwood: Penguin Books Australia Ltd., pp. 247–274

External links 
 Location of Huaca del Dragón in Trujillo (Wikimapia)
 Attractions in Trujillo, Peru
 UNESCO World Heritage Center: Chan Chan
 History Channel Classroom: Chan Chan
 Chan Chan information 
 Chan Chan - Chimu's Desert City (Flash)
 Heavy Rains Threaten Ancient City in Northern Peru
 Archaeologists Restore High Adobe Walls in Ancient Chimu City of Chan Chan

Former populated places in Peru
Archaeological sites in Trujillo, Peru
Archaeological sites in Peru